Bad Moon Born are an Australian five-piece Hard Rock band, formed in 2015. The band consists of Jordan Von Grae (Vocals), Voya (Guitar), Ned Koncar (Guitar), Shane Robinson (Bass) & John Ezilmez (Drums).

History 

Their debut EP, Chemical Lullabies, was released on 23 April 2016, drawing influences from Guns N' Roses, Audioslave, Avenged Sevenfold and Alter Bridge.

In November 2016 they signed to Mushroom Group subsidiary, Premier Artists, then signing to MGM Distribution in early 2017 and American booking agency TKO in mid-2018. They released their single, "Alive?", in June 2018, which had been recorded with Kato Khandwala producing.

2019 saw the band release their sophomore EP, War Is One, which was received favourably by both fans and music critics alike. In July of the same year, it was announced that vocalist and co-founder Frank Lakoudis had made the decision to leave the band, and that Jordan Von Grae (Carmeria) would be taking on vocal duties effective immediately.  

The group then embarked on a nationwide tour, in support of Buckcherry and Hardcore Superstar. The new lineup was met with exceedingly positive reviews, with many commending the band on their musical prowess and stage presence. Following the tour, it was decided that the band would take on a heavier, and more modern approach to their music, and would move towards developing a sound similar to bands like Architects (British Band), Bring Me the Horizon, and Asking Alexandria.

The band released a tongue-in-cheek cover of Billie Eilish's 'Bad Guy' in August 2020, which amassed over 90,000 streams on Spotify. Towards the end of 2020, co-founder and bass player Nick Allen announced he would be departing the group. He was replaced by Shane Robinson. 

Bad Moon Born entered 2021 with a plan to release 5 consecutive singles within a 12 month period, known collectively as The Heart From the Hollow series. The first four singles from this body of work achieved national airplay and international recognition, with the fifth and final installment, titled Light Leaves the Day due for release on the 12th of January, 2022. The end of 2021 also saw the band sign to the prestigious Australian heavy music booking agency, Destroy All Lines. The Australian 5-piece is currently in the studio working on their debut album, which is expected to be released sometime in 2022.

Discography

Extended Plays 

 The Heart From the Hollow - Singles Collection (2021-2022)

 War Is One (2019)

 Chemical Lullabies (2016)

Singles 

 "Alive?" (2018)
"Witch Trials" (2018)
-
"Noxa" (2020)
"Bad Guy" (2020)
-
"The Heart From the Hollow" (2021)
"Reins" (2021)
"Fallout" (2021)
"Waves (of the Wild)" (2021)
"Light Leaves the Day" (2022)

References

External links 

 

Australian hard rock musical groups
New South Wales musical groups
Musical groups established in 2015
2015 establishments in Australia